"4:AM Forever" is the fourth and the final single from the album Liberation Transmission, the third studio album by Welsh alternative rock band Lostprophets. It was released on 23 April 2007.

Track listing

(The B side of this edition was an etched design rather than containing music)

In a change from previous Lostprophets singles, there were two 7" vinyl releases and only one CD for this single. In addition to this, a special download release of the single was available from 4am on 28 April 2007, including a cover of "Going Underground" by The Jam. This release was limited to 1500 copies. An alternate version of the cover of "Going Underground" can also be heard on the compilation Punk the Clock, Vol. 3. Also, exclusive live versions of "4:AM Forever" were made available for download along with "Every Song" and "Never Know" on 16 April 2007.

In an interview on Popworld, Ian Watkins  stated that the song was called "4:AM Forever" because 4:AM is the hour in the night that most people die, known as "the witching hour".

Music video
The band is playing in an old house. However, Ian Watkins is sitting in the rain outside.

Personnel
 Ian Watkins – lead vocals
 Lee Gaze – lead guitar
 Mike Lewis – rhythm guitar
 Stuart Richardson – bass guitar
 Jamie Oliver – piano, keyboard, samples, vocals
 Josh Freese – drums, percussion 
 Ilan Rubin – drums, percussion

Chart positions

Notes

Lostprophets songs
Hard rock ballads
2007 singles
2006 songs
Song recordings produced by Bob Rock
Columbia Records singles